Stéphane Roux is a French comic book artist who is known mostly in America for his cover work for Marvel, DC and Semic comics.

Career
Stéphane Roux' has worked on such titles as Witchblade: Blood Oath, scripted by Jean-Marc Lofficier, as well as Sibilla (scripted by Jean-Marc Lainé) and Strangers in the Semic pocket and comics publications.

His longest cover assignment was on Birds of Prey (issues #104 to 127), with notable covers on various titles including Countdown to Final Crisis, Savage She-Hulk, X-Men: Worlds Apart, and The Amazing Spider-Man Extra #2. He has been working on the DC comics series Zatanna, written by Paul Dini, and Star Wars: Agent of the Empire, written by John Ostrander.
He is doing covers, fill-ins and short stories for all the majors comic-book companies. He did the poster for New York Comic Con 2013. He recently worked on a Batman: Legends of the Dark Knight story (issue # 41) written by Ray Fawkes. He also drew a Batman: Black and White story, written by Paul Dini  called "Role Models", in the Batman Black and White issue # 3, Jan 2014.
 
For French TV, he is one of the directors and the artistic director for the France 3 TV animated show Foot 2 rue, and does storyboards, character designs and Artistic Direction for animated productions.

Bibliography

Covers

 Action Comics #871
 The Amazing Spider-Man: Extra! #2 (Cover #1)
 Batman Confidential #22-25, 29, 30
 Birds of Prey #102-120, 122-127
 Birds of Prey: Blood and Circuits TPB
 Birds of Prey: Dead of Winter TPB
 Birds of Prey: Kids' Club TPB
 Birds of Prey: Metropolis or Dust TPB
 Birds of Prey: Platinum Flats TPB
 Black Canary: Wedding Planner #1
 Countdown to Final Crisis #9-11, 13, 15, 39-43
 DC Universe: Decisions #1-4
 Gamma Corps #1-3 
 Gamma Files #1
 Manhunter #23
 Ms. Marvel #35
 Savage She-Hulk #4 (Cover #1)
 Secret Six: Unhinged TPB
 Star Wars: Agent of the Empire #1-3
 Star Wars: Jedi - The Dark Side #1 (variant), #2-#5
 Star Wars: The Clone Wars - Strange Allies 
 Strangers (French comic book) #2
 Supergirl #14, 15, 33, 35
 Superman #682 
 Wizard: The Comics Magazine #188
 X-Men: Worlds Apart #4

Penciller
 Action Comics Annual #11
 Harley Quinn and Power Girl #1-6
 Infinite Crisis Secret Files #1
 Official Handbook of the Marvel Universe A-Z Premiere Hardcover #4
 Star Wars: Agent of the Empire #1 and 2
 Sibilla in Strangers #5, 6
 Witchblade: Blood Oath
 Zatanna #1-3 and #12

References

External links 

 
 The Art of Stephane Roux
 
 
 Variant Edition

French comics artists
Living people
French storyboard artists
Year of birth missing (living people)